France Culture is a French public radio channel and part of Radio France. Its programming encompasses a wide variety of features on historical, philosophical, sociopolitical, and scientific themes (including debates, discussions, and documentaries), as well as literary readings, radio plays, and experimental productions. The channel is broadcast nationwide on FM and is also available online.

History
France Culture began life in 1945 as the Programme National of Radiodiffusion Française (RDF). Renamed France III in 1958 and RTF Promotion in 1963, the channel finally adopted its present name later in that same year. The Programme National had originally carried the bulk of French public radio's classical music output; however, since the establishment in 1953 of the specialized "high-fidelity" music channel which was to become today's France Musique, France Culture has gradually become an almost exclusively speech-based channel.

Some landmark programmes
 Atelier de création radiophonique (since 1969)
 Black and Blue (1970–2008)
 Le Bon plaisir (1985–1999)
 Le Panorama (since 1968)
 Les Chemins de la connaissance (1970–1997)
 Les Chemins de la musique (1997–2004)
 Du jour au lendemain (1985–2014)
 La Matinée des autres (1977–2002)
 Les Nuits magnétiques (1977–1999)
 Une vie, une œuvre (since 1984)

Directors
 Agathe Mella (1973–1975)
 Yves Jaigu (1975–1984)
 Jean-Marie Borzeix (1984–1997)
 Patrice Gélinet (1997–1999)
 Laure Adler (1999–2005)
 David Kessler (2005–2008)
 Bruno Patino (2008–2010)
 Olivier Poivre d'Arvor (2010–2015)
 Sandrine Treiner (August 2015 – present)

External links

  
 Map of France Culture's transmitter network
 French Podcasts| Des papous dans la tête: English review of one of the current podcasts from France Culture presented by Françoise Treussard.

1946 establishments in France
Radio France
Radio stations established in 1946